Olga Tsutskova (June 6, 1952) is a painter who lives in Saint-Petersburg, Russia. Her works have been displayed in a number of exhibitions in Petersburg and other cities of Russia.

Her painting The Philosophers' ship has been dedicated to one of its passengers, Lev Karsavin.

Exhibitions

 1979 "Spring Exhibition" Artists' Union Exhibition Hall, Leningrad
 1980 "Youth of the Word" Artists' Union Exhibition Hall, Leningrad
 1981 "My Contemporaries" The Central Exhibition Hall "Manezh", Leningrad
 1982 "Autumn Exhibition" Artists' Union Exhibition Hall, Leningrad
 1982 "My country" The Central Exhibition Hall "Manezh", Leningrad
 1983 "My Leningrad" Okhta Exhibition Hall, Leningrad
 1983 "Autumn Exhibition" The Central Exhibition Hall "Manezh", Leningrad
 1984 "Youth of the World" Okhta Exhibition Hall, Leningrad
 1984 "Artists in struggle for peace" National Exhibition "Маnezh", Moscow
 1984 "My Leningrad" The Central Exhibition Hall "Manezh", Leningrad
 1985 "Artists and Peace" The Palace of Youth, Leningrad
 1985 "Youth and World" The Central Exhibition Hall "Manezh", Leningrad
 1985 "Regional Exhibition" The Central Exhibition Hall "Manezh", Leningrad
 1986 "Spring Exhibition" The Central Exhibition Hall "Manezh", Leningrad
 1986 "Youth spring exhibition" Artists' Union Exhibition Hall, Leningrad
 1986 "My Contemporaries" The Central Exhibition Hall "Manezh", Leningrad
 1987 "Youth of the World" National Exhibition "Маnezh", Moscow
 1988 "Modern Art from Leningrad" The Central Exhibition Hall "Manezh", Leningrad
 1991 "Regional Exhibition" The Central Exhibition Hall "Manezh", Leningrad
 1991 "14 modern Russian artists" Kunsthandel F.Kleijn Utrecht, Netherlands
 1992 "Contemporary Art from the "Аnnа" gallery" The Kunst center "Sint-Jan" Bruges, Belgium.
 1993 Personal Exhibition "Аnnа" gallery, Saint Petersburg
 1993 "Autumn Exhibition" Union Artists' Exhibition center, Saint Petersburg
 1993 "Contemporary Art from the "Аnnа" collection" Los Angeles, United States
 1994 "Boras community center", Sweden, Stockholm
 1995 "Jean art center", Seoul, South Korea.
 1998 "Connecting ages" The Central Exhibition Hall "Manezh", Saint Petersburg
 2003 "70th anniversary of St. Petersburg Artists' Union" The Central Exhibition Hall "Manezh", Saint Petersburg
 2003 "300th anniversary of St. Petersburg" Artists' Union Exhibition center, Saint Petersburg
 2007 Personal Exhibition "Russian idea. Philosophical steam-ship" The Central Exhibition Hall "Manezh" Saint Petersburg

References

 Professor Michael German, Modern art gallery. Anna. Leningrad. Leningrad, 1989.
 Связь времен. 1932—1997. Художники — члены Санкт—Петербургского Союза художников России. Каталог выставки. — Санкт — Петербург: ЦВЗ "Манеж", 1997. — с.301.
 Elena Kashchenko, Olga Sokurova, "Русская Идея. Философский пароход О.П.Цуцковой. Размышления о картине." Петербургские искусствоведческие тетради, АИС. СПб, 2008. Выпуск 12. С. 20

External links
 The official site by Olga Tsutskova

20th-century Russian painters
21st-century Russian painters
Realist artists
Russian avant-garde
Soviet artists
Analytical art
1934 births
Living people
Painters from Saint Petersburg